Anomoporia is a genus of fungi in the family Amylocorticiaceae. The genus was circumscribed by Czech mycologist Zdeněk Pouzar in 1966.

Species list
Anomoporia albolutescens
Anomoporia ambigua
Anomoporia bombycina
Anomoporia dumontii
Anomoporia flavissima
Anomoporia irpicoides
Anomoporia kamtschatica
Anomoporia myceliosa
Anomoporia neotropica
Anomoporia vesiculosa

References

Amylocorticiales
Agaricomycetes genera